This is a list of ice hockey players who were drafted in the National Hockey League Entry Draft by the Columbus Blue Jackets franchise. It includes every player who was drafted, regardless of whether they played for the team.

Key
 Played at least one game with the Blue Jackets
 Spent entire NHL career with the Blue Jackets

Draft picks

Statistics are complete as of the 2021–22 NHL season and show each player's career regular season totals in the NHL.  Wins, losses, ties, overtime losses and goals against average apply to goaltenders and are used only for players at that position. A player listed with a blank under the games played column has not played in the NHL.

See also
2000 NHL Expansion Draft

References
General

 
 

draft picks
 
Columbus Blue Jackets